Gibson Island is located in Nunavut's Kitikmeot Region within the northern Canadian Arctic.

References

Uninhabited islands of Kitikmeot Region